Kempton is an unincorporated community in Avon Township, Grand Forks County, North Dakota, United States. It is located northwest of Northwood. Kempton is the location of the Carlott Funseth Round Barn, which is listed on the National Register of Historic Places.

References

Populated places in Grand Forks County, North Dakota
Unincorporated communities in Grand Forks County, North Dakota
Unincorporated communities in North Dakota